"The Neverending World Tour" was the umbrella name used to describe a series of concert tours by Swedish pop duo Roxette. The name was derived from the title of the duo's debut single, 1986's "Neverending Love". Their sixth and final concert tour, it took place from 23 October 2009 until 8 February 2016, and consisted of 17 separate legs which saw the duo performing a total of 256 concerts in Europe, North and South America, Africa, the Middle East, Australasia and Asia.

It was their first concert tour in over eight years, following vocalist Marie Fredriksson's brain tumour diagnosis in September 2002. That diagnosis led to the cancellation of Roxette's planned appearance at the 2002 Night of the Proms concert series. "The Neverending World Tour" began with the band performing at the 2009 edition of that series, followed by a seven-date warm-up tour of Europe the following year, and more extensive tours in support of studio albums Charm School (2011) and Travelling (2012). Despite those two albums being released over the duration of the tour, set lists primarily consisted of many of their greatest hits; Fredriksson was unable to remember the lyrics of new songs because the illness impacted her short-term memory.

The tour received generally positive reviews, with numerous publications praising Fredriksson's voice and the quality of Gessle's songwriting. It was also a commercial success; the band performed to over 2.5 million people by the time the tour concluded in 2016, with a confirmed box office figure of over US$24 million, based on 45 shows reported to Billboard. The tour was due to be extended beyond 2016 as part of promotion for the duo's tenth studio album, Good Karma (2016). However, these dates were cancelled when Fredriksson was advised by her doctors to cease all touring activity, due to poor health.

Background and conception

The duo's seventh studio album, Room Service (2001), was promoted by their first concert tour in almost six years. Roxette were due to follow up this tour with a stint performing on the multiple-act Night of the Proms concert series, which was to begin in October 2002 and would see the band performing throughout Europe with a live orchestra to over 630,000 attendees during 52 shows. However, on 11 September 2002, vocalist Marie Fredriksson fractured her cranium after collapsing in a bathroom in her home. MRI scans later showed she had a brain tumour in the back of her head. She underwent surgery to successfully remove the malignant tumour, followed by months of chemotherapy and radiation treatment, Fredriksson was left permanently blinded in her right eye, and unable to read or write. She also could not speak for a considerable period of time afterward. All promotional activity for the duo's then-upcoming greatest hits compilation The Ballad Hits (2002) was subsequently cancelled, along with their scheduled appearance at Night of the Proms.

Fredriksson and Per Gessle each released solo albums over the following years, briefly reuniting as Roxette to record two new songs for their 2006 greatest hits compilation A Collection of Roxette Hits: Their 20 Greatest Songs!. During the 6 May 2009 date of the "Party Crasher Tour" at the Melkweg in Amsterdam – Gessle's European tour in support of his same-titled 2008 solo album – he and his band were joined on-stage by Fredriksson to perform acoustic renditions of several Roxette songs. Immediately after the gig, Gessle announced to Swedish publication Aftonbladet that Roxette would perform at the 2009 edition of Night of the Proms, which would begin on 23 October. That same date, Swedish newspaper Expressen reported that the duo had been recording material for a new Roxette album since May 2009. Marie also joined Per on stage again on 10 May 2009 at the Cirkus in Stockholm.

Tours and recordings

The band performed a series of seven warm-up shows throughout Europe, beginning on 4 August 2010 at Leif's Lounge – a music venue at Gessle's own Hotel Tylösand in Halmstad – and concluding on 12 September at the Saint Petersburg Ice Palace. Roxette's eighth studio album, Charm School, was released worldwide from 11 February 2011. Deluxe editions of the CD included a bonus disc containing 12 tracks recorded live in Halmstad, Saint Petersburg and Stavanger during the 2010 tour. The "Charm School World Tour" began on 28 February 2011 and saw the band performing in Europe, Asia, South America, South Africa and the Middle East. They performed at London's Wembley Arena on 15 November, their first concert in the United Kingdom in 17 years, they last played Wembley on 15 November 1994.

Their ninth studio album, Travelling, followed on 26 March 2012. It was a successor to 1992's Tourism, although, unlike that album – which was recorded in various locations and settings throughout the world during their "Join the Joyride! Tour" – Travelling was primarily recorded in studios in Sweden in-between legs of the "Charm School World Tour". "Roxette Live: Travelling the World" was less extensive than the preceding tour: it began on 14 February and lasted seven months, taking the band to Australasia and Asia, North and South America, South Africa and Europe. The first gig of the tour, on 11 February at the Vector Arena in Auckland, was cancelled when Gessle became ill during the flight from Stockholm; it began instead two days later in Australia. Live Nation Entertainment promoted the tour, after multiple local concert promoters in the country refused to work with the duo. Tickets for their 16 February show at the Sydney Entertainment Centre sold out within 30 minutes of going on sale to the public. The band went on to perform to over 100,000 people during their ten Australian shows. By the end of 2012, they had performed 153 concerts to a total audience of 1.5 million people.

Roxette ceased all touring activity in 2013, with Gessle rejoining Gyllene Tider to release their sixth studio album, Dags att tänka på refrängen, that April, while Fredriksson released her eighth solo album, Nu!, later that year in November. Fredriksson and Gyllene Tider each toured separately in Sweden to support their releases. A live CD and DVD/Blu-ray box set, Live: Travelling the World, was released on 6 December 2013. The set consisted of footage from three concerts from the South American leg of "Roxette Live: Travelling the World". In 2014, Roxette began the "XXX – The 30th Anniversary Tour", with dates initially running from 28 October to 29 November and consisting of 15 concerts in North Asia and Europe. The release of a new greatest hits compilation, Roxette XXX – The 30 Biggest Hits on 11 November, was timed to coincide with these concerts, except in Australia, where The RoxBox!: A Collection of Roxette's Greatest Songs was released on 6 February 2015—four days before the beginning of a tour there.

Roxette continued touring throughout 2015, performing their first concert ever in New Zealand on 7 February. The tour concluded a year later with a series of shows in South Africa; their 8 February 2016 performance at the Grand West Arena in Cape Town proved to be their final show. The duo's tenth studio album, Good Karma, was released in June 2016. It was due to be promoted with further concerts throughout Europe over the proceeding months. However, all of these concert dates were cancelled when Fredriksson was advised by her doctors to stop all touring activity, due to poor health. She released a statement which said: "Sadly, now my touring days are over and I want to take this opportunity to thank our wonderful fans that [have] followed us on our long and winding journey." By the end of the tour, Roxette had performed to a total of 2.5 million people (excluding music festival appearances) in over 50 countries.

Critical reception

Neal McClimon of The Hague Online gave a positive review to their 18 November 2009 Night of the Proms performance at the Rotterdam Ahoy, saying that they were given the "warmest welcome of the night. The fact that [they] had to cancel their previous tour due to Marie Fredriksson's well-documented [illness] seemed to resonate with the audience, [and they were] greeted by a crowd that offered thanks, warmth and love." He contrasted Roxette with other acts performing on the tour, writing: "There was one thing that stood out for me as they sang: they looked to be having a lot of fun, and it [was] great to see a band actually looking as though they wanted to be there." Time Out Dubai said that the duo "put on a phenomenal performance" for their 20 May 2011 concert at the Dubai World Trade Centre, but said the show was spoiled by the poor acoustics at the venue. They were also disappointed by the "lacklustre" crowd and asked: "If you want to stand and stare at your BlackBerry, what's the point of buying a ticket?"

The 2012 tour also received positive reviews. A writer for AusPop complimented the set list of their 14 February performance at the Brisbane Entertainment Centre, particularly the "near-flawless finale of mega hits", although was critical of the inclusion of "7Twenty7" – an album track from 1999's Have a Nice Day – "one of their least successful albums in Australia, which ultimately had everyone back in their seats." Their gig four days later in Melbourne was praised by the Herald Sun, which said: "From opener 'Dressed for Success', they had one of the most rapturous reactions the Rod Laver Arena has seen in years." The West Australian praised the entire band, writing that they "owned" Challenge Stadium during their two concerts at the Perth venue at the end of February. Fredriksson's performance at the Manchester Arena on 4 July was singled out for praise from The Guardians Dave Simpson, who said that "the poignancy she invests into their more wistful lyrics suggests [that performance is] part of her recovery."

In a review of their 31 August show at the Bell Centre, the Montreal Gazette praised Gessle's songwriting, saying: "There's much to be said for the way [he] has been able to take the eternal beauty of the I-IV-V chord progression (think "Wild Thing" or "Twist and Shout") – one of rock's most basic and perfect statements – and use it as a foundation for his own evergreens, which still sound pretty fresh. Look no farther  than 'Dressed for Success' or 'How Do You Do!' for confirmation." Rock Subculture applauded Fredriksson in their review of the band's 14 September concert in San Francisco's Nob Hill Masonic Center, writing: "The fact that she can still put on an amazing performance like last night is simply stunning. If I had not known about her history, I would never have imagined that she had such challenges in the past and overcame them in such a way."

By the beginning of the "XXX – The 30th Anniversary Tour" in late 2014, Fredriksson performed the entirety of concerts while sitting on a chair on stage. Will Gore of The Independent said of their 13 July 2015 London concert that there were "any number of '80 bands who make a living from neatly-packaged nostalgia tours. But not many could sell-out The O2 Arena on their own on a Monday night. ... Yet more than any other European band of that era, Roxette bridged the pop craft of their compatriots ABBA with the rockier sensibilities of American counterparts Heart and even Madonna. Their American success is easy to forget—four number ones between 1989 and 1991. Yet they became, unfairly, regarded as a pastiche almost as quickly." He contrasted this with Fredriksson's "current physical vulnerability" while performing on stage, which he called "a genuinely moving counterpoint to the charge of soullessness which often dogged Roxette's critical reception in the past. It might not be too late for a proper reappraisal."

Andy Rudd of the Daily Mirror reviewed the same concert, and remarked that Fredriksson "still hit all the power high notes, despite remaining seated for all the gig." He went on to praise her "haunting" and "beautiful vocal tones". Similarly, Goldenplec writer Mary Sexton said of their 1 June concert at the 3Arena in Dublin that Fredriksson was "sensational; her voice has a gorgeous timbre switching between her delicate head voice and her lower belt voice." Although she additionally noted that "during her solo moments, there are elements of dodgy intonation which may indicate why her voice is a bit lower in the mix. But make no mistake, she is a sensation, and you cannot possibly take your eyes off of her. Her tiny frame swells and fills the stage as she commands the audiences' attention." Annelise Ball echoed a similar sentiment in her review of their 20 February concert at the Rod Laver Arena in Melbourne, saying that "Despite her evident frailty, Fredriksson's voice is as strong and lovely as ever." She concluded by writing: "Fredriksson, you deserve accolades not only for your exceptional talent but also for your strength, courage and grace under pressure."

Set lists
The songs performed during each leg of the tour changed considerably as it progressed, with Gessle initially singing the majority of tracks. He said: "We had to take it step by step. I sang maybe 60–65% of the songs to begin with, and then the more we played the more Marie could sing." Each tour generally consisted of a "greatest hits"-type set list, as Fredriksson's illness "affected her short-term memory, making it difficult to learn new lyrics, while the old hits are inked firmly in her brain."

Tour dates

Cancelled or rescheduled shows

Personnel
Information derived from "Roxette Live: XXX – The 30th Anniversary Tour" book.

Musicians
 Marie Fredriksson – vocals
 Per Gessle – vocals, rhythm and acoustic guitars, harmonica
 Per "Pelle" Alsing – drums and percussion
 Magnus Börjson – bass and backing vocals
 Malin Ekstrand – backing vocals and percussion 
 Helena Josefsson – backing vocals and percussion 
 Christoffer Lundquist – lead guitar
 Dea Norberg – backing vocals and percussion 
 Clarence Öfwerman – keyboards

Management

 Mikael Bolyos – personal assistant to Marie Fredriksson
 Adam Bassett – lighting designer 
 Calle Brattberg – lighting designer 
 Marie Dimberg – artist management
 Åsa Elmgren – wardrobe
 Tumppi Haaranen – assistant tour manager
 Smick Hall-Hardgrave – pre-production manager
 Bo Johansson – tour manager and coordinator for Live Nation Entertainment
 Jakob Johnzén – backline
 Robert Kelber – lighting director and programming 
 Micke Lindström – production manager
 Mats Nilemar – business management
 Mikael Noguiera-Svensson – backline
 Åsa Nordin-Gessle – personal assistant to Per Gessle
 Patrick Woodroffe – lighting designer 

Production

 Abbe Ahlbin – sound technician
 Elin Arnelöv – truck driver
 Lottie Bremerhag – truck driver
 Mathias Gerstmann – bus driver
 Lars Jedermark – rigging
 Per Johansson – pilot
 Thomas Johansson – tour producer for Live Nation Entertainment
 Lucas Lindholm – lighting technician
 Sam Pattinson – video content 
 Gerth Pettersson – sound technician
 Bebban Pihlblad – lighting technician
 Mikael Sandelius – truck driver
 Fredrik Stormby – lighting technician
 Tina Vestin – travel arrangements
 Mattias Vidberg – truck driver
 Helli Windisch – bus driver

Opening acts
 Darren Hayes – 2011 London show
 1927 – 2012 Australian shows
 Hesta Prynn – 2012 New York show
 Mim Grey – 2012 Manchester show
 Glass Tiger – 2012 Canadian shows
 Boom Crash Opera – 2015 Australian shows
 Dragon – 2015 Australian shows
 Eurogliders – 2015 Australian shows
 Eskobar – 2015 European shows

References
Notes

Citations

Roxette concert tours
2009 concert tours
2010 concert tours
2011 concert tours
2012 concert tours
2013 concert tours
2014 concert tours
2015 concert tours
2016 concert tours
Concerts at Malmö Arena